WRID-LD (RF channel 36) is a low-power television station in Richmond, Virginia, United States. Owned by Gray Television, it is a translator of NBC affiliate WWBT (channel 12) and Ashland-licensed CW affiliate WUPV (channel 65). WRID-LD's transmitter is located near the shared studios of WWBT and WUPV on Midlothian Turnpike (US 60) in Richmond. The station is also a Daystar affiliate in addition to being a translator for WUPV and WWBT.

History
The station signed on June 2, 1992, with translator calls W48BI and was owned by VVILPTV, Inc.

Richmond's next WB affiliate?
When the market's WB station WAWB (channel 65, now WUPV) became a UPN affiliate in March 1997, Richmond was left without a full-time WB outlet. In the early 2000s, there were several attempts to launch a stand-alone station to carry the network. W48BI was one of two possible candidates for the network affiliate which declined the offer or launch a brand new station on channel 19 that later became an outlet for Charlottesville's CBS affiliate WCAV (channel 19) in 2004. NBC affiliate WWBT became a secondary WB affiliate from 1999 to August 2006 during the early morning hours. Fox affiliate WRLH-TV (channel 35) carried select Kids' WB programs from 1998 to 2001.

In late August 2006, WUPV took a secondary affiliation with The WB on select nights until that network merged with UPN to become The CW.

As a ShopNBC affiliate
In 2003, W48BI became a ShopNBC affiliate.

Daystar affiliation
In 2004, the station was bought by the Daystar Television Network and changed its calls to WRID-LP to reflect its Daystar affiliation and uses local insertion of the station's ID.

Sale to Gray Television
On August 27, 2021, it was announced that Gray Television would purchase WRID-LD from Daystar for $630,000. The sale was completed on January 4, 2022. Sometime later, WRID-LD began simulcasting the main channels of WWBT and WUPV.

Technical information

Subchannels
The station's digital signal is multiplexed:

Analog-to-digital transition
On January 12, 2007, the FCC granted Word of God Fellowship's request for permission to digital for Low-Power Digital Television (LD) on channel 51 and gave the station until January 12, 2010, to complete the flash cut. On August 9, 2011, Word of God Fellowship filed a second construction permit for a flash-cut to digital TV on channel 48 which was approved by the FCC on August 24, 2011, that was to expire on September 1, 2015.

The station officially began digital broadcasting on November 8, 2014. The FCC issued the station its digital license on December 5, 2016.

See also
WUPV
WRLH-TV
WWBT
WCAV-TV
WWBK-LP

References

RID-LD
Television channels and stations established in 1998
1998 establishments in Virginia
NBC network affiliates
Daystar (TV network) affiliates
The CW affiliates
Low-power television stations in the United States
Gray Television